Keydan (also Romanized as Keydān, Khaidūn, and Kheydūn) is a village in Shirvan Rural District, in the Central District of Borujerd County, Lorestan Province, Iran. At the 2006 census, its population was 909, in 210 families.

References 

Towns and villages in Borujerd County